Biesowice  is a village in the administrative district of Gmina Kępice, within Słupsk County, Pomeranian Voivodeship, in northern Poland.

The village has a population of 950.

See also
 History of Pomerania

References

Biesowice